The Girls' Brigade is an international, interdenominational Christian youth organisation. It was founded in 1893 in Dublin, Ireland. The modern organization was formed as the result of the amalgamation of three like-minded and similarly structured organizations in 1964: the Girls' Brigade of Ireland (1893), the Girls' Guildry of Scotland (1900), and the Girls' Life Brigade of England (1902). The international headquarters are currently based in Derbyshire, England.

The organization operates in over 50 countries worldwide and is divided into five Fellowships: African, Asian, Caribbean and Americas, European, and Pacific. International conferences have been held every four years since 1998, when the conference was in Australia. 

It was in Thailand in 2002, Northern Ireland in 2006, Malaysia in 2010, Australia in 2014 and Zambia in 2018. The Queen Mother and Princess Alice were Girls' Brigade's patrons until their deaths in 2002 and 2004 respectively. There are, at the moment, no living patrons. From 1983 until her death in 2020, Olive Hilda Miller was Vice-Patron of Brigade International.

Girls' Brigade Vision statement, principles, motto, and aim
The international vision statement is "Girls' lives transformed, God's world enriched"

The Girls' Brigade's principles are to acknowledge Jesus Christ as Saviour and Lord and seek to fulfil his aim, witness to the standard set by Jesus Christ and give positive teaching on Christian values, and promote a just society where all people are equally valued.

The motto of the Girls' Brigade is "Seek, serve and follow Christ" and its aim is "to help girls become followers of the Lord Jesus Christ, and through self control, reverence and a sense of responsibility to find true enrichment of life". Because of the youth development aspect of its work, the Girls' Brigade is a member of The National Council for Voluntary Youth Services (NCVYS) and has been since 1936, when it was one of NCVYS's founding organisations.

Girls' Brigade programme
The Girls' Brigade programme in many countries follows four themes: Spiritual, Physical, Educational and Social. These words spell SPES which is Latin for Hope. It was said that each girl in Girls' Brigade was a hope for the future. The four themes of the program are based on a Bible verse in Luke " And Jesus grew in body and wisdom, gaining favor with God and men " (Luke 2v52). Physical is in relation to Jesus growing in body, educational in relation to Jesus growing in wisdom, spiritual is in him growing closer to God and the social is the way that Jesus develops in his relationships with men. Also the girls are encouraged to participate in activities other than just badge work. These include leadership courses for 14- to 21-year-olds, and most companies or districts arrange camps or holidays, usually one per year. Moreover, the Girls' Brigade helps its members with the Duke of Edinburgh Award scheme.

Girls' Brigade projects
The type of activities the Girls' Brigade provides ranges from weekly activity-packed programmes to social engagement projects. Summer camps, activity days, residential training events and mission trips are also common.

Sections in Girls' Brigade

In Ireland, the Girls' Brigade are divided into the following sections 

 4 to 8 years - Explorer
 7 to 11 Years - Junior
 10 to 14 Years - Senior
 13 to 18 Years -  Brigader
 18 Years + - Leader, Lieutenant or Captain 
The Main leader is called the "Captain" and her next in charge is the "Lieutenant" 

In Scotland, the Girls Brigade is divided into the following sections:
4 to 7 years - Explorer (Primary 1 – Primary 3)
8 to 11 years - Junior (Primary 4 – Primary 7)
12 to 18 years - Brigader (1st Year – 6th Year)

In England and Wales, the Girls' Brigade is divided into the following Sections:
4 to 8 years - n:vestigate
8 to 11 years - n:gage
11 to 14 years - n:counta
14 to 18 years - n:spire
Optional 14–15 years (Year 10 in English school's system) - n:fluence 14–18 (foundation)
Optional 15–16 years (Year 11 in English school's system) - n:fluence 14–18 (intermediate)
Optional 16–17 years (Year 12 in English school's system) - n:fluence 14–18 (advanced)
Optional 18+ years - Leader (Can take only after completing the three above stages of n:fluence young leader training)

Girls cannot carry onto the next section of n:fluence 14–18 training without completing the previous section. They may however start at a slightly older age. If someone joins Girls' Brigade later in life and has not previously participated in Girls' Brigade they can complete n:fluence 18+ training in order to gain Leader status.

As of 31 March 2005, there were 6,109 n:vestigate members, 7,534 n:gage members, 4,016 n:counta members, 1,913 n:spire, 405 young leaders, 124 helpers, 1,967 leaders in 707 Companies within England & Wales.

In other countries, the names of the Sections (sometimes called Units) may vary, as may the ages of girls in those units. These age variations are usually based around the local schooling ages. Explorers may be called Cadets. Brigaders are sometimes called Pioneers. In some countries, there are 4 different Sections or Units.

In Australia, the Units are:
Cadets - 5–8 years (Prep – Year 2)
Juniors - 8–11 years (Year 3 – Year 5)
Seniors - 11–14 years (Year 6 – Year 8)
Pioneers - 14–21 years (Year 9 – 21 years of age)

In New Zealand, the Girls Brigade companies are divided as follows:

Juniors - 5–8 years old (New Entrant/Year 1 – Year 4)
Seniors - 9–12 years old (Year 5 – Year 8)
Pioneers - 13–17 years old (Year 9 – Year 13 i.e., during High School)

In Malaysia, the Girls Brigade companies are divided as so:

Cadets - 5–8 years old
Juniors - 9–11 years old
Seniors - 12–14 years old
Pioneers - 15–18 years old

Girls who have reached 15 years of age can become Young Leaders. A girl can become a Leader after they are 18 years old.

Crest
The crest is a registered trade mark of Girls' Brigade England & Wales. However, all Girls' Brigade companies around the world have the right to use it. 

In the centre is a Cross, the symbol of Christ and his Church. Below the cross is a Lamp, which represents the light of the Girls' Brigade shining upon the World. Above it is a Crown, of Christ as King. Behind it all, is a Torch, the flame of Christ's living spirit.

The badge incorporates symbols from the three original organizations and is, therefore, in itself a symbol of union, as well as faith and allegiance to the Lord Jesus Christ.

The Girls Brigade which formed in Ireland in 1893, brought in the Cross. The Girls' Guildry which formed in 1900 in Scotland, brought in the Lamp. Lastly, the Girls' Life Brigade, which formed in 1902 in England, brought in the Crown. They amalgamated in 1965. A competition was held to design the crest for the amalgamated organisation, which was won by Constance Fasham.

International
The International President of the Girls' Brigade is Priscilla Penny (Africa). The International Treasurer is Joyce Evans of (England and Wales). The International Vice-Presidents are the Chairmen from each Fellowship.

All figures next to country names are of the number of Girls' Brigade members within the country, they are accurate as of 2004:

African Fellowship
Bridget Leher (Zimbabwe) is the Fellowship Chairman. There are 14 African countries that have Girls' Brigade companies:

 Botswana (149)
 Democratic Republic of Congo
 Ghana (6,000)
 Kenya (4,050)
 Malawi (184)
 Namibia
 Nigeria (14,961)
 Sierra Leone (338)
 South Africa (1,664)
 Swaziland (125)
 Tanzania (600)
 Uganda (1,217)
 Zambia (3,090)
 Zimbabwe (671)

Asian Fellowship
Tay Poh Imm (Singapore) is the Fellowship Chairman.  There are 12 Asian countries that have Girls' Brigade companies:

 Bangladesh (215)
 Brunei (65)
 Cambodia
 Hong Kong (1,700)
 India (125)
 Malaysia (3,145)
 Mongolia (55)
 Philippines (1,100)
 Siberia (20)
 Singapore (3,695)
 Thailand (1,205)
 Western New Guinea (43)

Caribbean and Americas Fellowship
Andrea Stevens (Cayman Islands) is the Fellowship Chairman.  There are 21 countries in the Americas that have Girls' Brigade companies:

 Anguilla (132)
 Antigua (210)
 Bahamas (653)
 Belize (67)
 Bermuda (20)
 Brazil (216)
 British Virgin Islands (181)
 Canada (20)
 Cayman Islands (299)
 Curaçao
 Dominica (82)
 Haiti (40)
 Jamaica (1,032)
 Montserrat (24)
 Nevis (92)
 Sint Eustatius (28)
 Saint Kitts (296)
 Saint Martin (215)
 Saint Vincent (64)
 Trinidad and Tobago (86)
 United States (105)

Europe Fellowship
Claire Rush (Northern Ireland) is the Fellowship Chairman.

There are six (see below) countries within the Europe fellowship that have Girls' Brigade companies:
 England and Wales (600)
 Republic of Ireland (1,868) 
 Northern Ireland (22,540)
 Romania (92)
 Scotland (13,753)
 Kosovo (15)

Currently England & Wales run as one country for Girls' Brigade even though they are distinct countries.

Pacific Fellowship
Renelle Neale (Australia) is the International Vice President for the Pacific.  There are 13 countries within the Pacific Fellowship that have Girls' Brigade companies:

 American Samoa (67)
 Australia (3,051)
 Cook Islands (355)
 Kiribati
 New Zealand (1,907)
 Niue (161)
 Papua New Guinea (435)
 Samoa
 Solomon Islands (3,299)
 Tonga (114)
 Tokelau
 Tuvalu (116)
 Vanuatu (75)

See also
Boys' Brigade

References

External links
 The Girls' Brigade International Council
 England and Wales 
 Scotland
 Australia
 New Zealand
 Malaysia

Christian non-aligned Scouting organizations
Derbyshire Dales
Organisations based in Derbyshire
Religious organizations established in 1893
Youth organisations based in the United Kingdom